Metasequoia glyptostroboides, the dawn redwood, is a fast-growing, endangered deciduous conifer. It is the sole living species of the genus Metasequoia, one of three genera in the subfamily Sequoioideae of the family Cupressaceae. It now survives only in wet lower slopes and montane river and stream valleys in the border region of Hubei and Hunan provinces and Chongqing municipality in south-central China, notably in Lichuan county in Hubei.

In 1941, the genus Metasequoia was reported by paleobotanist Shigeru Miki as a widely distributed extinct genus based on fossils, before attracting considerable attention a few years later when small populations were found alive in central China. It is a particularly well-known example of a living fossil species. The tree faces considerable risks of extinction in its wild range due to deforestation, however it has been planted extensively in arboreta worldwide, where it has proved a popular and fast-growing ornamental plant. If the species had been discovered later, it might have become extinct before being investigated.

History

Although it was commonly known from the fossil record from across the northern hemisphere, the dawn redwood was considered extinct until the mid-twentieth century. When the genus Metasequoia was first described in 1941, it was from Mesozoic Era fossils, none of which were less than 150 million years old. While studying fossil samples of the family Cupressaceae, Dr. Shigeru Miki from Kyoto University identified a divergent leaf form. He realized he had discovered a new genus, which he named Metasequoia, meaning "like a sequoia".

In the same year, Kan Duo (Toh Kan, 1903–1961), professor of Forest Management, National Central University, Chongqing, (formerly Chungking) observed an enormous living specimen while performing a survey in Sichuan and Hubei provinces. Though unaware of Miki's new genus, he recognized the unique traits of the tree. Unfortunately, while he collected some plant material, he did not attempt to identify or publish his findings. This tree formed part of a local shrine, where villagers called it Shuǐshān  or "water fir".

In 1943, Wang Zhan (Chan Wang, 1911–2000) of the National Bureau of Forest Research, the Ministry of Agriculture and Forests, Chongqing, collected samples from an unidentified tree in the village of Moudao  (formerly Motaochi, Maodaoqi or Modaoxi) in Lichuan County, Hubei province—now believed to be the same tree Kan discovered.  The samples were determined to belong to a tree yet unknown to science, but World War II postponed further study.

Professors Zheng Wanjun (Cheng Wan-Chun) and Hu Xiansu (Hu Hsien-Hsu) made the pivotal connection between Miki's fossil genus and the living samples in 1946, and provided the specific epithet "glyptostroboides", after its resemblance to the Chinese swamp cypress (Glyptostrobus).

In July 1947, the Arnold Arboretum of Harvard University provided $250 to fund an expedition by Zheng Wanjun's assistant Hua Jingchan (Ching-Shan Hwa 1921- ) to collect seeds for the arboretum from the Metasequoia type tree in Moudao, and trees in the nearby Metasequoia Valley (Shuishaba Valley).  Hua's collecting trip returned with several kilos of seed that were distributed over the next few months for growth trials to Chinese institutions; the Arnold Arboretum, Missouri Botanic Garden, and elsewhere in the United States; botanic gardens at Kew, Edinburgh, and other locations in the United Kingdom; as well as botanic gardens in continental Europe and worldwide.

Description

The cones are globose to ovoid,  in diameter with 16-28 scales arranged in opposite pairs in four rows, each pair at right angles to the adjacent pair; they mature in about 8–9 months after pollination.

While the bark and foliage are similar to another closely related genus of redwoods, Sequoia, M. glyptostroboides differs from the coast redwood in that it is deciduous, like Taxodium distichum (bald cypress). Similar to T. distichum, older trees may form wide buttresses on the lower trunk. The trunk forms a distinctive "armpit" under each branch. The bark is vertically fissured and tends to exfoliate in ribbon-like strips.

This tree was killed by a lightning strike in 1951. Several dawn redwoods of this height still live in the eastern part of Metasequoia Valley, where the tree was discovered.

The thickest and tallest dawn redwoods listed by Monumental Trees are both in the Longwood Gardens of Kennett Square in Pennsylvania, United States. Both trees were planted in 1948 and measured in 2018.

Ecotypic variation
Ecotypic variation has developed in a variety of microhabitats. Three variations have been observed based on the size of their cones, large, medium, and small. The large cone type is found growing on mountain slopes, develops a broad canopy, seeds more readily and is more drought tolerant. The small cone type is found near stream banks, is more sensitive to drought, and develops a more uniform trunk.

Related species 
Together with Sequoia sempervirens (coast redwood) and Sequoiadendron giganteum (giant sequoia) of California, M. glyptostroboides is classified in the subfamily Sequoioideae of the family Cupressaceae. Although it is the only living species in its genus, three fossil species are known as well. The other Sequoioideae and several other genera have been transferred from the Taxodiaceae to the Cupressaceae based on DNA analysis.

Conservation
Studies carried out between 2007 and 2009 counted 5,371 trees primarily in Lichuan, Hubei, with much smaller groups in Shizhu, Chongqing and Longshan, Hunan.

The floodplain of Metasequoia Valley in Hubei had already been turned to rice paddies by the time of the tree's discovery, but was once probably a more extensive dawn redwood forest. Such a forest would have been similar to bald cypress forests in the United States, with many similar species growing in association. Additionally, houses made of Metasequoia wood 200–300 years old still exist and probably date back to the original settlement of the valley.

Since its discovery, the dawn redwood has become something of a national point of pride, and it is protected under Chinese law and also planted widely. However, it is still listed as endangered in the wild. Cutting of trees or branches is illegal, but the demand for seedlings drives cone collection to the point that natural reproduction is no longer occurring in the dawn redwood forest. In addition, the landscape has been highly modified by human use, and a 1980 expedition found that the habitat has significantly degraded since the tree's discovery. Most of the other vegetation has been cut, and most of the area is no longer suitable ground for seedlings.

A survey in the 2000s counted and measured all wild dawn redwoods. (The type tree,  at breast height, was in poor health and therefore excluded from the study) No seedlings were found, and if they ever do appear it is legal to remove and transplant them. The species will continue to live in yards, parks and on roadsides all over China, but the M. glyptostroboides forest ecosystem could disappear when its mature trees die.

Cultivation
Since the tree's rediscovery, the dawn redwood has become a popular ornamental tree in parks and gardens worldwide.

Dawn redwood seed arrived at the Arnold Arboretum on January 5, 1948, and was shipped to arboreta around the world soon after. By 1951, the species had entered the commercial horticultural trade in the US, and following media excitement about the new discovery, including in the San Francisco Chronicle of March 25, 1948, sales soon took off.

Dawn redwood has proved an easy tree to grow in temperate regions, and is now widely planted as an ornamental tree. This rapid rate of growth has led to consideration for using the tree in forestry plantations. It has been discovered that M. glyptostroboides will thrive in standing water, much like bald cypress, and if left branched to the ground in full sun, will develop the large, contorted boles that have made it famous. Limbing or pruning at an early age will prohibit this formation later on.

It is tolerant of soggy, waterlogged soils; in the wild it is adapted to growing on flood plains. Until it is established in a specific site, it is prone to drought and inadequate water availability. The dawn redwood is recommended for urban areas in the Midwest, Southeast, and East Coast of North America, as its fast growth rate and tolerance for air pollution make it widely adaptable and able to thrive where other species might suffer. This species tends to struggle without irrigation in arid climates such as the American West unless planted directly on or adjacent to a body of water such as a pond or stream. This species is also highly susceptible to damage from contact with heavy amounts of winter de-icing salt.

In the 1980s, it was discovered that many of the second-generation trees in cultivation suffered from inbreeding depression (extremely low genetic variability), which could lead to increased susceptibility to disease and reproductive failure. Many sources claim that the original 1947 seedlots came from as few as one tree; however, this has proven to be false. The original seeds did have a wide range of source trees, and the inbreeding depression is more likely to come from self-pollination by isolated trees. However, the total cultivated population still had less genetic variation than the wild ones, and more widespread seed-collecting expeditions in China in the 1990s sought to resolve this problem and restore genetic diversity to cultivated M. glyptostroboides.

In China
Pizhou, Jiangsu has the longest dawn redwood avenue in the world. The avenue is approximately 60 km long with over one million trees. The Water Forest in Xinghua, Jiangsu is named after the many dawn redwood trees found there in the park.

In the United Kingdom
The dawn redwood is frequently encountered across the UK. Growth has been fastest in the south-east, but it is believed the tree may have a longer future in the more humid western regions. The first dawn redwood to be planted out in the UK was at the Cambridge University Botanic Garden. The seed was not from the Arnold expedition, but came to Cambridge directly. The Botanic Garden's Annual Report for 1949 declares: ‘Seeds of Metasequoia glyptostroboides, sent by Dr Silow from China to Professor F T Brooks, germinated freely. Three of the seedlings have been planted out: one in the Yard at the back of the Range and two beside the Pond (now called the Lake).' The tree on the south-west side of the Lake is still living, as at July 2019. Seed distributed in the 1940s to Hillier Gardens near Winchester, UK, have thrived and are now the emblem of the gardens. The TROBI Champions are at Woking Park, Surrey: 22 m height by 144 cm d.b.h, Clare College, Cambridge: 21 m × 129 cm (planted 1949), and Wayford Woods, Somerset: 32 m × 99 cm. Several cultivars are available providing a range of different foliage colours and textures. The cultivar ‘Golden Oji’ has gained the Royal Horticultural Society’s Award of Garden Merit.

In the United States
Dawn redwoods thrive over a large, crescent-shaped region that encompasses the eastern and southern United States, as well as on the West Coast. Many institutions, such as the Arnold Arboretum of Harvard University, have fine specimens. The H. H. Hunnewell estate in Wellesley, Massachusetts, has two specimens (numbers 29 and 34) that date back to the initial distribution of seed by the Arnold Arboretum in 1949. There is a small grove of dawn redwoods at Bailey Arboretum in Locust Valley, New York, including one tree which is claimed to be the world's largest by diameter. The New York City Department of Parks and Recreation has begun planting dawn redwoods on sidewalks throughout Manhattan and Brooklyn, this link  maps them.  Washington, D.C.'s Urban Forestry Division has planted hundreds throughout that city, including all of the street trees in the 1800 block of Redwood Terrace, NW. A dawn redwood grows outside of the Rosicrucian Research Library at Rosicrucian Park in San Jose, California, as a memorial to H. Spencer Lewis. It was planted in 1950 from a seedling from the lot brought from China by Dr. Ralph Chaney, and donated by an unnamed donor to H. Spencer Lewis's widow for this purpose. The Mildred E. Mathias Botanical Garden on the UCLA campus includes a dawn redwood. In North Carolina, a private endeavor is working to create a Metasequioa reserve on 50 acres of uplands in the Sauratown Mountains. Portland, Oregon, is home to some of the oldest dawn redwoods in the US. One specimen planted in the Hoyt Arboretum in 1948 was 103' tall at last measurement and in 1952 earned the distinction of being the first dawn redwood to bear cones in the Western Hemisphere in 6–8 million years. A dawn redwood was planted at Southern Illinois University Carbondale in Carbondale, Illinois by William Marberry in 1950 and remains there to this day.

Gallery

References

Further reading

 He, Zican, Jianqiang Li, Qing Cai, Xiaodong Li, and Hongwen Huang. 2004. "Cytogenetic Studies on Metasequoia Glyptostroboides, a Living Fossil Species". Genetica. 122, no. 3: 269–276.
 International Metasequoia Symposium, Ben A. LePage, Christopher J. Williams, and Hong Yang. The Geobiology and Ecology of Metasequoia. Topics in geobiology, v. 22. Dordrecht: Springer, 2005. 
 Proceedings of the Second International Symposium on Metasequoia and Associated Plants, August 6–10, 2006, Metasequoia: Back from the Brink? An Update. Edited by Hong Yang and Leo J. Hickey. Bulletin of the Peabody Museum of Natural History, Volume 48, Issue 2 31 October 2007, pp. 179–426. 
 Bartholomew, Bruce, D. E. Boufford, and S. A. Spongberg. "Metasequoia glyptostroboides--Its present status in central China." Journal of the Arnold Arboretum 64.1 (1983): 105–128.
 Farjon, A. (2005). Monograph of Cupressaceae and Sciadopitys. Royal Botanic Gardens, Kew. .
 Hanks, D.A. Crescent Ridge Dawn Redwoods Preserve (2005). http://www.dawnredwood.org
 Jahren, A. H. & Sternberg, L. S. L. (2003). Humidity estimate for the middle Eocene Arctic rain forest. Geology May 2003 pdf file
 
 
  
 Williams C.J., LePage, B.A., Vann D.R., Tange, T., Ikeda, H., Ando, M., Kusakabe, T., Tsuzuki, T. and T. Sweda. (2003). Structure, allometry, and biomass of plantation Metasequoia glyptostroboides in Japan. Forest Ecology and Management, 180(103): 287-301. 
 Williams C.J., Johnson A.H., LePage, B.A., Vann D.R. and T. Sweda. 2003. Reconstruction of Tertiary Metasequoia Forests II. Structure, Biomass and Productivity of Eocene Floodplain Forests in the Canadian Arctic. Paleobiology, 29(2): 271-292.

External links

 Metasequoia in The Gymnosperm database
 Crescent Ridge Dawn Redwoods Preserve
 The metasequoia organisation
 More information on the Dawn Redwood, including largest specimens
 Giant redwoods in the U.K.
 Notes on the dawn redwood from the Arnold Arboretum, including a link to a summary of archival materials on the discovery of the dawn redwood. 

glyptostroboides
Endemic flora of China
Flora of Hubei
Flora of Sichuan
Trees of China
Plants described in 1948
Garden plants of Asia
Ornamental trees
Critically endangered flora of Asia
Deciduous conifers